The GCC Champions League, is an annually organized football league tournament for club of the Arabian Peninsula.

The 2007 edition was the 23rd time that it was organised and was won by United Arab Emirates side Al-Jazira for the first time.

The Groups

Results

Group A
(In Abu Dhabi)

Group B
(In Doha)

Group C

Semi-finals

1st Legs

2nd Legs

Final

Winner

 
 

GCC Champions League
Gulf Club Champions Cup, 2007